The quadrate pebblesnail, scientific name Somatogyrus quadratus, is a species of small freshwater snail with a gill and an operculum,  an aquatic gastropod mollusk in the family Hydrobiidae. This species is endemic to the United States.  Its natural habitat is rivers.  This species is possibly extinct because there is no recent survey information. It is known to have had a very restricted distribution and there had been a habitat disturbance.  This species was endemic to the Tennessee River system and was known to exist from Muscle Shoals and adjacent Shoal Creek, Lauderdale County, Alabama.  It has not been reported since the river was impounded. Based on the fact that the species has not been observed since the dams were constructed, it is widely believed that that change in habitat possibly caused the species's extinction.

References

 

Molluscs of the United States
Somatogyrus
Gastropods described in 1906
Taxonomy articles created by Polbot